{{DISPLAYTITLE:C25H35N3O}}
The molecular formula C25H35N3O (molar mass: 393.575 g/mol, exact mass: 393.2780 u) may refer to:

 Amesergide (LY-237733)
 Undecylprodigiosin